The Women's 2021 CIB Egyptian Open is the women's edition of the 2021 CIB Egyptian Open, which is a 2021–22 PSA World Tour event. The event will take place in Cairo, Egypt between 10 and 17 September, 2021. The event's main sponsor is the Commercial International Bank of Egypt.

Nouran Gohar beat Nour El Sherbini in an all Egyptian final, being the first time Gohar has won this tournament.

Seeds

Draw and results

Semi-finals and final

Main Draw

Top half

Bottom half

See also
 2021 Men's Egyptian Squash Open

References

Women's Egyptian Open
Squash in Egypt
Egyptian Squash Open
Egyptian Squash Open